The following page lists electrical generating stations in Quebec, Canada.

Quebec produces close to 96% of its electricity through hydropower. The James Bay Project is Quebec's largest generation complex, with an installed capacity of 16,527 megawatt of power, approximately 40% of the province's peak load. Hydro-Québec, the government-owned public utility is the main power generator in the province with 59 hydroelectric facilities located across the province, for a total installed capacity of 34,490 MW.

Hydroelectric

Owned by Hydro-Québec 

List of hydroelectric generating stations owned and operated by Hydro-Québec Production.

Stations with partial Hydro-Québec ownership

Privately owned hydroelectric generating stations 
List of privately owned hydroelectric generating stations in Quebec, including facilities owned by municipal utilities.

Other Renewables

Wind  

List of wind farms in Quebec.

Biomass 
List of biomass and waste generating stations in Quebec.

Nuclear 
List of nuclear generating stations in Quebec.

Fossil fuel 
List of fossil fuel generating stations in Quebec.

Off-grid 
List of all generating stations in Quebec serving loads not connected to the main North American power grid.

See also

List of electrical generating stations in Canada
La Cité de l'Énergie
List of reservoirs and dams in Canada

Notes and references

Notes

References

External links
Hydro-Québec official website
Parc de production hydroélectrique d'Hydro-Québec
Alphabetical list of private and municipal power stations

 
electrical generating stations
Hydro-Québec
Lists of power stations in Canada